Hoseynabad-e Mahlar-e Sofla (also Romanized as Ḩoseynābād-e Mahlār-e Soflá) is a village in Doruneh Rural District, Anabad District, Bardaskan County, Razavi Khorasan Province, Iran. At the 2006 census, its population was 120, in 27 families.

References 

Populated places in Bardaskan County